Philippe Fix (born 1 May 1937) is a French illustrator and author of children's books. He studied Decorative Arts in Strasbourg at the Ecole des Arts Decoratifs and Ecole des Beaux-Arts in Paris.

Career
Born in Grendelbruch, Département du Bas-Rhin, Alsace, Fix created the comic character Chouchou for the magazine Salut les copains in 1963. The magazine Chouchou was founded specifically for the character in 1964, and in the same year it appeared as a "singer" on two records with the voice of Jean-Jacques Debout at higher speed, including one song "La Mascotte des copains" with Fix's lyrics. In 1965 it appeared in the magazine Pilote. The book Chouchou au Far West was published in 1966.

Books with Fix' illustrations have appeared in French, German, English, Italian, Finnish, Danish, Dutch, Welsh, Swedish, Norwegian (bokmål), Spanish, Afrikaans, Japanese, Lithuanian, Portuguese, and Hebrew.

Awards 
 1970 : "Mention" Premio Critici in Erba, Bologna Children's Book Fair (Italy) for  Serafin und seine Wundermaschine, written by Alain Grée and Janine Ast, which Fix illustrated.
 1972 : "Mention" Premio Grafico Fiera di Bologna per l'Infanzia, Bologna Children's Book Fair (Italy) for  Serafin: lesen verboten, written by Alain Grée, illustrated by Fix.
 1990: Hans Christian Andersen Diploma for Il y a cent ans déjà

Bibliography

References

Sources 
 Philippe Fix on ricochet-jeunes.org
 Illustrations at theartofchildrenspicturebooks.blogspot.de
 The Book of Giant Stories, Publishers Weekly
 Not So Very Long Ago: Life in a Small Country Village, Publishers Weekly

1937 births
Living people
People from Bas-Rhin
French children's book illustrators